Rebecca Talen (born 27 October 1993) is a Dutch professional racing cyclist. She is the daughter of the cyclist John Talen.

See also
 Rabo-Liv Women Cycling Team

References

External links

1993 births
Living people
Dutch female cyclists
People from Meppel
Cyclists from Drenthe
21st-century Dutch women